The Royal Dart Yacht Club was founded in 1866 located in Kingswear, on the River Dart, Devon, England.

There is a large ground-floor bar and informal dining area, opening onto the riverside terrace. Upstairs is a formal dining room with seating for about 50 people, as well as the much larger Quarter Deck function room and a large balcony with panoramic views of the harbour.
The club is located close to Darthaven Marina.

External links
Club website
Dartmouth Regatta Sailing Website

Royal yacht clubs
Yacht clubs in England
1866 establishments in England
Sports clubs established in 1866